Afatsim is the first portrait CD of music by Israeli composer Chaya Czernowin, released in 1999. It was reviewed in the Paris Transatlantic Review as “gritty stuff,” featuring “grainy string writing” and “imaginative use of non-European instruments”.

Track listing
 “Afatsim” – 
 “String Quartet” – 
 “Die Kreuzung” – 
 “Dam Sheon Hachol” – 
 “Ina” –

References

1999 albums
Chaya Czernowin albums
Instrumental albums